Saima Rauha Maria Harmaja (8 May 1913, Helsinki – 21 April 1937) was a Finnish poet and writer. She is known for her tragic life and early death, which are reflected in her sensitive poems.  She came from a prominent family; her maternal grandfather was Arvid Genetz.  She wrote four collections of poetry.

At the age of 15, Harmaja contracted the lung disease tuberculosis. There were good seasons and bad seasons, and in April 1937 she died at the age of 23. She is buried in the Hietaniemi Cemetery in Helsinki. Saima Harmaja kept a diary, which was published posthumously.

A literary club, Saima Harmaja Society, was founded in her memory.

Bibliography

Notes

External links
 

 
 Saima Harmaja Society
 Translations of poetry

1913 births
1937 deaths
Writers from Helsinki
20th-century Finnish poets
20th-century deaths from tuberculosis
Finnish women poets
Women diarists
20th-century Finnish women writers
Burials at Hietaniemi Cemetery
Tuberculosis deaths in Finland
20th-century diarists